St. Cloud Hospital is a hospital in St. Cloud, Minnesota, United States. It is a Catholic-affiliated, not-for-profit institution and part of the CentraCare Health System. The hospital has more than 9,000 employees, 400 physicians and 1,200 volunteers. It serves 690,000 people in a 12-county area.

History

What would eventually become St. Cloud Hospital began as a succession of hospitals beginning in the late 1880s.

The first such institution was St. Benedict's Hospital, founded in 1886 by a group of Roman Catholic nuns from the Order of St. Benedict at the urging of Dr. A.C. Lamothe Ramsay. The hospital played a major role in aid following the Sauk Rapids Cyclone and was in need of expansion by 1889.

In 1889, the sisters accepted a gift of land southeast of the city for a larger hospital, St. Raphael's, and the new facility opened on May 30, 1890. However, the failure of the city to extend roads and bridges to the area made it virtually inaccessible. The hospital never held more than seven patients at a time. Ten years later, a new hospital was constructed adjacent to the original building in 1900.

After years of increasing patient admissions, the sisters broke ground on a new hospital north of St. Cloud in May 1926. The hospital was renamed St. Cloud Hospital and formally dedicated on February 9, 1928. This remains the current site of the hospital.

In 1962, the sisters relinquished ownership of St. Cloud Hospital and incorporated it into a not-for-profit corporation. In 1975, the Diocese of St. Cloud joined with the sisters in helping to maintain the Catholic character of the hospital. Since 1995, the hospital has operated under the auspices of the local Catholic Church of St. Cloud.

Also in 1995, the corporations of St. Cloud Hospital and the St. Cloud Clinic of Internal Medicine merged to form the nonprofit CentraCare Health System.

Site

St. Cloud Hospital's main site is located north of downtown St. Cloud on the west bank of the Mississippi River. The hospital building has 11 floors (seven above ground),  of floor space (not including the attached CentraCare Clinic), and sits on a 30.4 acre (0.12 km2) plot of land.

Hospital Services

CentraCare Heart & Vascular Center

The CentraCare Heart & Vascular Center is dedicated to the prevention, discovery and management of cardiac disease. It is a full-service heart center with advanced capabilities in interventional cardiology, electrophysiology and cardiac surgery.

The heart center is staffed by cardiologists, surgeons, and nurses and includes technology such as a 64-slice CT scanner and induced hypothermia equipment. Services include diagnostic cardiology, interventional cardiology, cardiac surgery, electrophysiology, peripheral vascular program, pediatric cardiology, nuclear medicine and cardiac rehabilitation.

A research department also allows patients to participate in clinical trials with programs such as Cleveland Clinic, Mayo Clinic and Duke University.

Surgical & Special Care Services

Surgical & Special Care Services encompasses outpatient surgery, inpatient surgery, a surgical care unit, a progressive care unit and intensive care. The department has 18 operating rooms, over 100 surgeons, and performs 14,000 operations a year.

Inpatient and outpatient surgery serves patients requiring trauma, orthopedic, urological, ear/nose/throat, retina, cardiovascular, neurological, plastic and bariatric surgery. The surgical staff is experienced in laparoscopic, minimally invasive and muscle-sparing techniques, as well as the robotic Da Vinci Surgical System.

The surgical care unit includes contains eight progressive care beds for patients requiring a greater level of care.

Coborn Cancer Center

The Coborn Cancer Center is a Comprehensive Community Cancer Program certified by the American College of Surgeons that provides medical oncology evaluation and care and an extensive range of treatment options to support cancer patients and their families. The center is the first program in the United States to become a member of the Mayo Clinic Cancer Care Network.

Services include chemotherapy, radiation therapy, diagnostic imaging (including CT scanning) and clinical drug trials.

The St. Cloud Hospital Breast Center also offers breast cancer screenings, assessments, diagnostic work-ups, education and treatment plans as well as a mobile mammography unit and other services.

Bone & Joint Center

The Bone & Joint Center is collaboration between St. Cloud Hospital and St. Cloud Orthopedic Associates. It offers an array of specialty and subspecialty orthopedic surgical services.

Services include an inpatient unit, inpatient and outpatient surgery, emergency and trauma care, total joint replacements, total joint revisions, sports medicine, spinal surgery, shoulder surgery, arthroscopic surgery, foot and angle surgery, fracture care and specialized imaging services including musculoskeletal radiology.

Emergency Trauma Center

The Emergency Trauma Center is certified by the American College of Surgeons as a Level II trauma center. The center has 38 private patient rooms including those dedicated to the special needs of children, trauma victims and psychiatric patients.

Trauma center staff are board-certified emergency medicine physicians and nurses certified in trauma care and advanced life support.

The facility includes an FAA-approved helipad serviced by LifeLink III air ambulance.

Neurosciences & Rehabilitation Center

The Neurosciences & Rehabilitation Center offers services designed to enhance the quality of life for adult and pediatric patients.

The care center includes:

Neuromedical and neurosurgical inpatient unit, including neurodiagnostic and stroke care
20-bed inpatient rehabilitation unit
St. Cloud Hospital Sleep Center, for diagnosing and treating sleep disorders
St Cloud Hospital Rehabilitation Center, providing outpatient physical, occupational and speech therapy for neck and back pain, traumatic brain injuries, stroke and work-related injuries, as well as rehabilitation for pediatric developmental or acquired disabilities
Respiratory Care, providing assessment, treatment and pulmonary function testing, as well as outpatient pulmonary rehabilitation

Women & Children's Center

Parent, Child & Women's Services includes the Family Birthing Center, Children's Center, Child & Adolescent Specialty Center and Women's Health.

Within the Children's Center, a Level II and III neonatal intensive care unit provides specialized care to premature infants and newborns with serious health conditions. And inpatient pediatric unit offers care for sick children, while the pediatric intensive care unit cares for children with life-threatening illnesses.

The Child & Adolescent Specialty Center offers specialized outpatient services for allergies, behavioral health, cardiology, cleft and craniofacial care, cancer, urology and outpatient procedures requiring brief observation.

Women's Health offers inpatient gynecology care and an outpatient Women's Specialty Center. Inpatient care includes education and support from a women's health case manager for women recovering from gynecological surgeries. The Specialty Center offers women's health education, a women's health library, perinatology and behavioral health services.

Home Care & Hospice Services

Home Care combines telemonitoring technology with care provided by nurses, physical occupational and speech therapists, social workers and home health aides. Services include rehabilitation, wound care, pediatrics, infusion and palliative care.
A team of skilled professionals works together with the patient's physician to provide a total continuum of care.

Behavioral Health Services

Behavioral Health Services offers a range of mental health and chemical dependency services including child, adolescent and adult outpatient treatment, partial hospitalization and inpatient services.

The Behavioral Health Clinic provides outpatient mental health services, including evaluations, testing, counseling and treatment for mental health problems.

Certifications, rankings and awards
Thomson Reuters Top 100 Hospital (eight-time honoree)
Thomson Reuters Top 100 Heart Hospital (eight-time honoree)
U.S. News & World Report "America's Best Hospitals" for endocrinology (2006), urology (2006, 2008 & 2010), orthopedics (2007 & 2008) and ear, nose & throat care (2012)
Nursing Magnet Hospital
Level II Trauma Center and Lifelink III
Level III Neonatal Intensive Care Unit
Coborn Cancer Center received a three-year approval with Commendation and an Outstanding Achievement Award as a Community Hospital Comprehensive Cancer Program from American College of Sugeons Commission on Cancer.
Radiation Oncology department earned a three-year accreditation from the American College of Radiology.
NCCTG Cancer Research Program
STAR Breast Cancer Research Program
CentraCare Diabetes Center - ADA approved
Intensive Care Unit - Beacon Award, VHA Inc. ICU Award for Clinical Excellence
Surgery Center of Excellence by the American Society for Bariatric Surgery

References

External links
 St. Cloud Hospital Homepage
 CentraCare Health System Homepage
 CentraCare Health's Employment Page
 Archival Images of Saint Cloud Hospital from the Saint Benedict's Monastery Archives

Hospital buildings completed in 1890
Hospital buildings completed in 1928
Hospitals in Minnesota
Buildings and structures in St. Cloud, Minnesota
Hospitals established in 1886
1886 establishments in Minnesota
Catholic hospitals in North America
Trauma centers
Catholic hospital networks in the United States
Catholic health care